Public opinion of same-sex marriage in the United States has changed dramatically since the late 1980s; by the early 2020s, an overwhelming majority of Americans approved of the legality of these marriages. 

A December 2022 Quinnipiac University poll found that 68 percent of Americans supported legal recognition of same-sex marriage and 22 percent opposed it. Approval of same-sex marriage is higher in younger generations; among 18-34 year olds, 76% are in favor of legal recognition and 7% oppose it. From 1988 to 2009, support for recognized same-sex marriage increased between 1% and 1.5% per year, and accelerated thereafter, rising above 50% in Pew Research Center polling for the first time in 2011. 

A 2021 Public Religion Research Institute poll of the states found majority support for same-sex marriage in 47 states, ranging from 50% in South Carolina to 85% in Massachusetts. There is plurality support for legal recognition of same-sex marriage in Alabama, where 49% support and 47% oppose. Only Mississippi and Arkansas have majority opposition to same-sex marriage; in Mississippi, 55% oppose and 44% support, while in Arkansas, 52% oppose and 47% support same-sex marriage. 

Garretson (2018) writes: "The transformation of America's response to homosexuality has been — and continues to be — one of the most rapid and sustained shifts in mass attitudes since the start of public polling."

Overview
Public opinion of same-sex marriage in the United States has changed radically since polling of the American people regarding the issue was first conducted in 1988. The issue of same-sex marriage was not brought up as an issue for public debate until at least the 1950s and was not a political issue until the 1970s. According to statistician Nate Silver of the poll aggregator FiveThirtyEight, from 1988 to April 2009, support for same-sex marriage increased between 1% and 1.5% per year and about 4% from April 2009 to August 2010. A Pew Research Center poll, conducted from May 21, 2008, to May 25, 2008, found that, for the first time, a majority of Americans did not oppose same-sex marriage, with opposition having fallen to 49%. An ABC News/Washington Post poll, conducted from April 21, 2009, to April 24, 2009, found that, for the first time,  a plurality of Americans supported same-sex marriage at 49% and that a majority of Americans supported the marriages of same-sex couples validly entered into in one state being recognized in all states at 53%. A CNN/Opinion Research poll, conducted from August 6, 2010, to August 10, 2010, found that, for the first time, a majority of Americans supported same-sex marriage at 52%. A Greenberg Quinlan Rosner Research poll, conducted from January 25, 2015 to January 31, 2015, found that, for the first time, 60% of Americans supported same-sex marriage.

Continual polling by Gallup over the course of more than two decades has shown that support for same-sex marriage has grown rapidly, while opposition has simultaneously collapsed. In 1996, 68% of Americans opposed same-sex marriage, while only 27% supported. In 2018, 67% of Americans supported same-sex marriage, while only 31% opposed. As of 2018, 60% of Americans said they would not mind if their child married someone of the same gender.

National polls

Post-Obergefell v. Hodges

2020–present 
According to The Nation, a private poll conducted by Centerline Action before the passage of the Respect for Marriage Act in late 2022 found that 73 percent of Americans support same-sex marriage.

A December 2022 Quinnipiac University poll found that 68% of Americans supported same-sex marriage, while 22 percent opposed it.

A September 2022 Grinnell College National Poll found that 74% of Americans believe same-sex marriage should be a guaranteed right while 13% disagreed and 13% were uncertain.

A May 2022 Gallup poll found that 71% of Americans supported same-sex marriage, while 28% were against.

A June 2021 CBS News/YouGov poll found that 64% of Americans supported same-sex marriage while 36% were opposed. Two-thirds of Republicans over age 45 are opposed, but the opinions of Republicans under age 45 are almost evenly split with 52% oppose and 48% support same sex marriage.

An 2021 Public Religion Research Institute poll found that 67% of Americans supported same-sex marriage, while 32% were opposed.

A June 2021 Gallup poll found that 70% of Americans supported same-sex marriage and 29% were against.

A June 2020 Gallup poll found that 67% of Americans supported same sex marriage, while 31% were against, matching their May 2018 record high.

A Public Religion Research Institute nationwide & state-by-state poll conducted in 2020 found that 67% of Americans supported same-sex marriage, 27% opposed, and 5% refused to answer or answered "don't know," with there being majority support for same-sex marriage in 46 states, and plurality support in 4 states.

A 2020 American National Election Studies poll found that 66% of Americans supported legal recognition of same-sex marriage, 20% supported civil unions, while 14% of Americans were opposed to any legal recognition of same-sex relationships.

2016–2019 
A June 2019 CBS News poll found that 67% of Americans supported same-sex marriage, while 28% were against.

A June 2019 IPSOS/Reuters poll found that 58% of Americans supported same-sex marriage, while 28% were against.

A May 2019 Pew Research Center poll found 61% of Americans supported same-sex marriage while 31% were against.

A May 2019 Gallup poll found that 63% of Americans supported same sex marriage, with 36% opposing it.  While this is a drop when compared to 2018, same sex marriage approval still remains stable.

A May 2018 Gallup poll found that 67% of Americans supported same-sex marriage, 31% opposed, and 2% had no opinion.

An April 2018 NBC News poll found that 64% of Americans supported same-sex marriage, 33% opposed, and 3% had no opinion. The poll was reported by NBC News as notable as it found that 55% of Southerners supported same-sex marriage, which represented an historic change for a region that was previously staunchly opposed.

A Public Religion Research Institute nationwide & state-by-state poll conducted throughout 2017 found that 61% of Americans supported same-sex marriage, 30% opposed, and 9% refused to answer or answered "don't know," with there being majority support for same-sex marriage in 44 states, plurality support in 4 states, plurality opposition in 1 state, and majority opposition in 1 state.

An August 2017 NBC News/The Wall Street Journal poll found that 60% of Americans supported same-sex marriage, 33% opposed, and 7% had no opinion.

A June 2017 Pew Research Center poll found 62% of Americans supported same-sex marriage, 32% opposed, and 6% had no opinion. This marked the first Pew poll where a majority of Baby Boomers supported same-sex marriage, did not oppose same-sex marriage.

A May 2017 Gallup poll found 64% of Americans supported same-sex marriage, 34% opposed, and 2% had no opinion. This marked the first Gallup poll where a majority of Protestants supported same-sex marriage.

A May 2016 Gallup poll found 61% of Americans supported same-sex marriage, 37% opposed, and 2% had no opinion. This marked the first Gallup poll where a majority of Americans aged 65 and older supported same-sex marriage.

Pre-Obergefell v. Hodges

2010–2015

2015 
A May Gallup poll found 60% of Americans supported same-sex marriage, 37% opposed, and 3% had no opinion.

A February–March Wall Street Journal poll found that 59% of Americans favored same-sex marriage.

A January–February Human Rights Campaign poll found that 60% of Americans favored same-sex marriage, while 37% opposed. The same poll also found that 46% of respondents knew a same-sex couple who had gotten married.

A February 12–15 CNN/ORC poll found that 63% of Americans believed same-sex marriage is a constitutional right, while 36% disagreed.

2014 
A May Gallup poll found that 55% of Americans supported same-sex marriage, 42% opposed, and 4% had no opinion.

An April Public Religion Research Institute poll sponsored by the Ford Foundation found that 55% of all Americans supported same-sex marriage, while 39% were opposed.

A Pew Research Center poll released in March found 54% of Americans favored same-sex marriage, 39% opposed, and 7% didn't know. It also researched support for same-sex marriage among Republican leaning voters in the United States. 61% of Republican leaning voters aged 18–29 supported allowing same-sex couples to marry, while only 27% of Republican leaning voters over 50 years of age were supportive. 52% of Republican voters aged 18–50 supported same-sex marriage.

A Washington Post/ABC News poll from February–March found that a record high of 59% of Americans approved of same-sex marriage, with only 34% opposed and 7% with no opinion. The poll also revealed that 53% of the population in the states that did not allow same-sex couples to marry at the time approved of same-sex marriage. 50% of respondents agreed that the Equal Protection Clause of the Fourteenth Amendment to the United States Constitution guarantees the freedom to marry regardless of sex or sexual orientation, while 41% disagreed, and 9% had no opinion. The same poll also found that 81% of people believed that businesses should not be allowed to refuse to serve gays and lesbians. 16% disagreed, and 3% had no opinion. 78% thought that gay couples can be "just as good parents" as straight couples, while 18% disagreed and 4% had no opinion.

2013 
A November/December Public Religion Research Institute poll sponsored by the Ford Foundation found that 53% of all Americans supported same-sex marriage, while 41% were opposed and 6% unsure. The margin of error was 1.1%. The same poll found clear majorities in favor of same-sex marriage in the Northeast (60%), West (58%), and Midwest (51%). Only the South was evenly divided 48% in favor to 48% opposed. Further, nearly 7-in-10 (69%) of those born after 1980 (ages 18–33) favored allowing same-sex couples to marry.

A Bloomberg National Poll conducted by Selzer & Company taken during September 20–23, 2013 found that 55% supported same-sex marriage, while 36% opposed and 9% were unsure.

A September Quinnipiac University poll found that 56% of American adults and 57% of registered voters supported same-sex marriage. Only 36% of both groups were opposed.

A July 10–14 poll by Gallup found support for same-sex marriage at 54%, a record high, and double the support of 27% Gallup first measured when the question was asked in 1996.

A July poll by USA Today found that 55% of Americans supported same-sex marriage, while 40% did not.

A May 9 Washington Post-ABC News poll found that 55% of Americans supported same-sex marriage, while 40% did not.

A March 20–24 CBS News Poll found that 53% of Americans supported same-sex marriage, 39% opposed it, and 8% were undecided. The same poll also found that 33% of Americans who thought same-sex couples should be allowed to legally marry said they once held the opposite view and had changed their opinion.

A March 7–10 Washington Post-ABC News poll found that 58% of Americans supported same-sex marriage, while 36% opposed. The poll indicated that 52% of GOP-leaning independents under 50 years old supported same-sex marriage.

A March Quinnipiac University poll of voters found 47% supported same-sex marriage and 43% were opposed.

2012 
A November 26–29 Gallup poll found that 53% of Americans supported same-sex marriage, while 46% did not.

A November 16–19 CBS News poll found that 51% of Americans supported same-sex marriage, while 40% did not.

A November 7–11 ABC News/Washington Post poll found that 51% of respondents supported same-sex marriage, while 47% were opposed.

A June 6 CNN/ORC International poll showed that a majority of Americans supported same-sex marriage being legalized at 54%, while 42% were opposed.

A May 22 NBC News/Wall Street Journal poll showed that 54% of Americans would support a law in their state making same-sex marriage legal, with 40% opposed.

A May 17–20 ABC News/Washington Post poll showed that 53% believed same-sex marriage should be legal, with only 39% opposed, a low point for opposition in any national poll that far.

A May 10 USA Today/Gallup Poll, taken one day after Barack Obama became the first sitting president to express support for same-sex marriage, showed 51% of Americans agreed with the President's endorsement, while 45% disagreed. A May 8 Gallup Poll showed majority support for same-sex marriage nationwide, with 50% in favor and 48% opposed.

An April Pew Research Center poll showed support for same-sex marriage at 48%, while opposition fell to 44%.

A March 7–10 ABC News/Washington Post poll found 52% of adults thought it should be legal for same-sex couples to get married, while 42% disagreed and 5% were unsure. A March survey by the Public Religion Research Institute found 52% of Americans supported allowing same-sex couples to marry, while 44% opposed.

A February 29 – March 3 NBC News/Wall Street Journal poll found 49% of adults supported allowing same-sex couples to marry, while 40% opposed.

2011 
Public support for same-sex marriage continued to grow in 2011. In February and March, a Pew Research Center for the People & the Press survey found about as many adults favored (45%) as opposed (46%) allowing same-sex couples to marry legally, compared to a 2009 Pew Research survey that found just 37% backed same-sex marriage while 54% opposed. In March and April, polls by Gallup, ABC News/Washington Post, and CNN/Opinion Research all showed that a majority of Americans approved of same-sex marriage.

In March, Pew reported that 57% of Democrats favored legal recognition for same-sex marriage, and 51% of independents agreed, but only 23% of Republicans agreed. An April CNN/Opinion Research Poll showed majority support including 64% of Democrats and 55% of independents, but only 27% of Republicans.

In March 2011, Democracy Corps conducted a survey of 1,000 likely 2012 election voters in 50 congressional districts considered political battlegrounds. It asked respondents to rate their feelings on the same-sex marriage issue on a 0–100 scale, with 100 being "very warm" or favorable feelings, and 0 being "very cold" or unfavorable feelings. 42% were on the "cool" or unfavorable side, and 35% were on the "warm" or favorable side.

A May 2011 Gallup Poll also showed majority support for same-sex marriage, 53% in favor to 45% opposed. Gallup measured a 9-point increase in support, from 44% to 53%, indicating that support increased faster than in any previous year.

2010 
An August Associated Press/National Constitution Center poll found 52% agreed that the federal government should give legal recognition to marriages between couples of the same sex, an increase from 46% in 2009. 46% disagreed, compared to 53% in 2009.

An August CNN/Opinion Research Poll showed that 49% of respondents thought gays and lesbians do have a constitutional right to get married and have their marriage recognized by law as valid, and 52% thought gays and lesbians should have that right.

Earlier polls in February and May found opinion divided within the margin of error, but with a consistent trend of increasing support and decreasing opposition compared to prior years. One August poll found majority opposition, and a November exit poll of 17,504 voters by CNN during the 2010 midterm elections found 53% opposition with 41% support.

2000s

2009 
An April 30 ABC News/Washington Post poll found support for allowing same-sex couples to marry in the United States ahead of opposition for the first time: 49% support, 46% opposition, and 5% with no opinion. In addition, 53% believed that same-sex marriages performed in other states should be legal in their states. 62% of Democrats and 52% of Independents supported same-sex marriage, while 74% of Republicans opposed.

An April 22–26 poll by CBS/New York Times found 42% supported marriage for same-sex couples, 25% supported civil unions, and 28% opposed any legal recognition of same-sex couples. 5% of respondents were unsure.

In April, Nate Silver noted that the discrepancy in support for same-sex marriage appeared to result from 5-10% of respondents who favored civil unions over same-sex marriage, but given only two choices, would support same-sex marriage.

A LifeWay Research poll conducted in August 2009 found that 61% of Americans born between 1980 and 1991 saw nothing wrong with two people of the same gender getting married, while 39% disagreed. The survey was conducted on a demographically representative survey of 1,200 U.S. adults between 18 and 29 years old.

2008 
A December poll revealed that 32% supported the concept of civil unions, 31% would offer full marriage rights to same-sex couples, and 30% opposed any legal recognition for gay and lesbian partnerships.

In a July 17 poll by the Quinnipiac University Polling Institute, 55 percent opposed same-sex marriage, and 36 percent were in favor.

An ABC News poll found that a majority (58%) of Americans remained opposed to same-sex marriages, while a minority (36%) support them. However, on the question of a constitutional amendment, more were opposed than for it. The majority (51%) of Americans said the issue should be left for the states to decide, while 43% would agree with amending the Constitution.

A July poll by Quinnipiac University Polling Institute revealed that 32% would allow homosexual partners to legally marry, 33% would permit them to form civil unions, and 29% would grant them no legal recognition.

2006 
In May, a Gallup poll found that opposition to same-sex marriage had fallen slightly, as other polls found a sharper dip. In the poll, when asked if marriages between homosexuals should be recognized by law as valid, with the same rights as traditional marriages, 58% (down 1 point from Aug 2005, and 9 points from March 1996) of Americans responded that they should not be recognized. 39% (up 2 points from Aug 2005, and 12 points from 1996) felt same-sex marriages should be recognized by law. If "homosexuals" is replaced with "same-sex couples", 42% backed same-sex marriage while 56% opposed it.

In June, a Princeton Survey Research Associates/Pew Research Center poll found a rise in those opposed to same-sex marriage, with 56% disapproving.

In March, a Princeton Survey Research Associates/Pew Research Center poll concluded that 39% of Americans supported same-sex marriage, while 51% opposed it, and 10% were undecided.

A Pew study in March found that 51% opposed same-sex marriage, with 39% supporting it, and the level of "strongly opposing" same-sex marriage had fallen from 42% to 28%. Pew's May 2008 Survey found that for the first time, a majority of people did not oppose same-sex marriage at 49%. 20% opposed and 29% strongly opposed same-sex marriage, up 1% from the March 2006 Pew Research Results.

2004 
In December, a Princeton Survey Research Associates/Pew Research Center poll found 61% of Americans opposed (including 38% "strongly opposed").

20th century 
An October 1989 Yankelovich Clancy Shulman telephone poll found that 84% of Americans opposed same-sex marriage, with 12% supporting same-sex marriage, and 4% being not sure.

A 1988 International Social Survey Programme poll found that 80.3% of Americans opposed same-sex marriage, while 11.9% of Americans supported same-sex marriage, and 2.1% of Americans neither agreed or disagreed.

A 1988 National Opinion Research Center / General Social Survey / University of Chicago poll found that 82.6% of Americans opposed same-sex marriage, 10.7% of Americans supported it, 3.9% of Americans neither agreed or disagreed, and 2.8% didn't know / etc.

Demographic differences

By age

By education

By ethnicity or race

By gender

By geography

By income

By political affiliation

By political affiliation by generation

By political affiliation by ideology

By religious affiliation

By religious attendance

Regional, state, and local level polls

By state, federal district, or territory

By metro area

By region

See also

 LGBT rights in the United States
 Societal attitudes toward homosexuality § United States
 Equality Act (United States) § Public opinion

Notes

References

Same-sex marriage in the United States
Same-sex marriage